The Honi language (豪尼語), also known as Haoni, Baihong, Hao-Bai, or Ho, is a language of the Loloish (Yi) branch of the Tibeto-Burman linguistic group spoken in Yunnan, China. The Chinese government groups speakers of this language into the Hani nationality, one of China's 56 recognized nationalities and considers the language to be a dialect of the wider Hani languages. Honi itself is divided into two distinct dialects, Baihong and Haoni, which may be separate languages.

Phonology

Consonants 

A voiceless // may also be realized as a lateral fricative [].

Vowels 

In the Mojiang dialect, vowel length is distinctive among vowels // and syllabic vowels //.

References

Wang Hongxiao [王红晓]; Zhao Dewen [赵德文]. 2017. Zhongguo Mojiang Hanizu Haoniren wenhua shilu [中国墨江哈尼族豪尼人文化实录]. Kunming: Yunnan People's Press [云南人民出版社].

Southern Loloish languages
Languages of China